Severina may refer to:

People
Given name

 Severina, or Ulpia Severina (fl. 270–275), Roman empress
 Severina (singer) (born 1972), Croatian singer using stage name "Severina"
 Severina (album), 1989 album by Severina Vučković
Severina de Orosa (1890–1984), Filipino physician and Hispanist writer

Surname

 Maria Severina (born 1995), Russian chess player

Places
 Santa Severina, a town and comune in the province of Crotone, in the Calabria region of southern Italy

Arts and entertainment

Literature
 Severina (Silone), a 1981 posthumous novella by Ignazio Silone
 Severina (Rey Rosa), a 2011 novella by Rodrigo Rey Rosa

Music
 "Severina", a single from the 1986 album God's Own Medicine by The Mission

Other
 9716 Severina, an asteroid

See also
 Severin (disambiguation)
 Severine (disambiguation)